Andrea Oriana (born 16 June 1973) is an Italian former butterfly swimmer. He competed in two events at the 1996 Summer Olympics.

References

External links
 

1973 births
Living people
Italian male butterfly swimmers
Olympic swimmers of Italy
Swimmers at the 1996 Summer Olympics
Sportspeople from the Province of Como